Al Nreijat, is a village in Aley District in the Mount Lebanon Governorate of Lebanon.

Populated places in Aley District